

The Tattler is the student newspaper of Ithaca High School in Ithaca, New York.  Founded in 1892, it is one of the oldest student newspapers in the United States.  It is published twelve times a year and has a circulation of about 3,000, with distribution in both the school and in the community.

The Tattler has traditionally been almost entirely student-run, with a student editorial board and student writers working with the assistance of a faculty advisor (usually a teacher in the IHS English department). The publication has expanded considerably in the past ten years, increasing its number of pages, introducing distribution outside of the high school, and developing an online presence.

Famous alumni include Paul Wolfowitz (Features Editor, 1959–1960; Editorial Assistant, 1960–1961) and Stephen Carter (Editor-in-Chief, 1971–1972).

The Tattler's slogan, a pun on the New York Times''' slogan, is "All the news that's fit to tattle."

The Tattler has twice (in 2005 and 2007) won the Ithaca High School Class/Ithaca Public Education Initiative "Support Our School Community Award," an award given to the extracurricular activity "which has had the most positive impact on IHS".

History
The first issue of the Tattler was published on December 1, 1892. The paper concentrated on news for its first decade, but from about 1910 to 1930, it resembled a yearbook.  During the Second World War, it was published weekly as a broadsheet and subscribed to the wire services.

There appears to have been a gap during the 1950s when the Tattler was not published.  It returned by 1959 as a magazine-sized publication. It reported on the continuous upheavals in the administration (garnering administration hostility) until the early 1980s, switching to its current tabloid size during the early 70s.  From 1984 to 1992, it was renamed the IHS Press.

The "Tattler" name was restored (with the volume numbering restarted) in 1992 and has been in continuous publication since then.

2005 controversy

The Tattler has been at the center of a controversy regarding censorship that has attracted attention from both the local media and national experts on journalism law.

In 2004 and early 2005 The Tattler published a number of controversial articles, most notably several articles strongly critical of the Ithaca High School administration and a restaurant review that some considered racist. In response, in January 2005 the Ithaca City School District issued a set of guidelines, declaring The Tattler a school-sponsored publication and giving the faculty advisor considerably greater power to edit or remove objectionable material.  The Tattler student editors believed that these guidelines violated First Amendment rights, and were angered that they had transferred power from what had been a primarily student-run organization to the school administration.

In the February 2005 issue, The Tattler's faculty advisor, Stephenie Vinch, found a sexually explicit cartoon in the issue offensive and insisted that it be removed. The student editors refused to allow a "censored" version of the issue to be published, and appealed the decision to IHS principal Joe Wilson and ICSD superintendent Judith Pastel. Both Wilson and Pastel ultimately rejected the appeals, also finding the cartoon obscene. In the midst of the controversy, Vinch resigned her position as faculty advisor, and school publication of The Tattler ground to a halt.  At one point principal Wilson ordered The Tattler office closed.

Publication of The Tattler went underground, running out of editor-in-chief Rob Ochshorn's house.  The student staff produced a complete underground March issue, which the high school administration denied permission to distribute on school grounds because it contained the same cartoon that was earlier deemed obscene. Two further underground issues, in April and May, were also completed and were given approval to be distributed on school grounds.

Meanwhile, nationally renowned IHS mathematics and computer science teacher Roselyn Teukolsky was named interim faculty advisor for The Tattler.  The student staff worked under Teukolsky's supervision to produce the June 2005 issue back on school grounds.

Later that month, the student editors announced that they were suing the Ithaca City School District, Superintendent Pastel, Principal Wilson, and Assistant Superintendent for Curriculum and Instruction Bill Russell. The suit alleges that the school district violated the student editors’ First Amendment freedom of the press rights by instituting a policy of prior restraint. The suit seeks that the school district guidelines for the Tattler be declared unconstitutional, and that the district be prevented from enforcing these or any similar guidelines.

Some believe this to be a case of inappropriate censorship, violating freedom of the press, and see the school district as guilty of unconstitutionally censoring dissenting and controversial material. Others believe the school district is within their constitutional authority, taking appropriate action to prevent obscene and detrimental material from being distributed to the student body.  The two Supreme Court cases which govern this area of the law, Tinker vs. Des Moines (1969) and Hazelwood vs. Kuhlmeier (1988), are somewhat contradictory; the question of whether the paper is a "Tinker paper" or a "Hazelwood paper" is likely to be important to the outcome. "Tinker papers", established as "open forums", are relatively exempt from school censorship, while "Hazelwood papers", established as "limited public forums", are allowed more school control and restriction.

The matter is currently pending before Chief Judge Norman A. Mordue of the United States District Court for the Northern District of New York. The case is Ochshorn, et al., v. Ithaca City School District, et al., 5:05-CV-695. A judgment was originally expected in 2007. In March 2009 and again in January 2010, Judge Mordue refused to dismiss the lawsuit, although neither judgment was a complete victory for the plaintiffs. The case is now expected to be heard in the Second Circuit U.S. Court of Appeals in the late spring or summer of 2010.

A similar situation occurred in the 1970s, with a student lawsuit against the District for censorship.  The matter was settled out of court, but as part of the settlement the District made certain promises regarding the editorial independence of the paper in the future.  At this time the details of the settlement are unavailable, but it is possible that the new guidelines violate this legal settlement.

News coverage about censorship
 "IHS Student Editors Dispute Content Rules", by Anne Ju, The Ithaca Journal, 13 May 2005
 "The Tattlers: IHS Senior Editors Continue Fight for the First Amendment", The Ithaca Times, 22 June 2005
 “Editorial: 'Tattler' troubles: Students and school must respect freedom”, The Ithaca Journal, 22 June 2005
 “Schooled”,  Columbia Journalism Review, September/October 2005
 "Ithaca High 'Tattler' Case Goes to Federal Appeals Court", The Ithaca Journal'', 10 February 2010

References

External links

Alumni & Friends of the Tatter
Wiki about the Tattler case

Newspapers published in New York (state)
Newspapers established in 1892
High school newspapers published in the United States